Norman Dlomo (born 18 April 1975 in Vereeniging, Gauteng) is a South African long-distance runner.

Dlomo finished tenth at the 2005 World Half Marathon Championships. He competed in the marathon at the 2007 World Championships, but did not finish the race.

Achievements

Personal bests
3000 metres - 8:04.16 min (2002)
5000 metres - 13:32.47 min (2002)
10,000 metres - 28:54.19 min (2006)
Half marathon - 1:02:24 hrs (2005)
Marathon - 2:11:47 hrs (2007)

External links

sports-reference

1975 births
Living people
South African male long-distance runners
South African male marathon runners
Athletes (track and field) at the 2008 Summer Olympics
Olympic athletes of South Africa